Wem Rural is a large civil parish in Shropshire, England that encircles, but does not include, the market town of Wem (a separate parish formally known as "Wem Urban"). It includes the villages of Aston and Barkers Green (east of Wem), Coton, Edstaston, Quina Brook and Pepperstreet (north of Wem), Horton, Newtown, Wolverley and Northwood (northwest of Wem) and Tilley (south of Wem). Prees railway station is also in the parish. The population of the Civil Parish at the 2011 census was 1,659.

The parish has three electoral wards - Edstaston ward to the north and north east of Wem, Newtown ward to the north and north west of Wem and the confusingly named Wem ward to the west, south and east of Wem.

The parish was formed in 1900 from the outer part of the parish of Wem, the inner part of which became the parish of Wem Urban in the Wem urban district.  Wem Rural was part of Wem Rural District until 1967, when the rural district was abolished and became part of North Shropshire Rural District.  From 1974 to 2009 it was part of North Shropshire district.

See also
Listed buildings in Wem Rural

References

External links
Wem Rural Parish Council
Wem Rural Community Plan

Civil parishes in Shropshire